Kerry Young may refer to:

 Kerry Young (The Bill), a character in the British TV series The Bill
 Kerry Young (author) (born 1955), British writer